Jory Prum (January 31, 1975 – April 22, 2016), also known as Jory K. Prum, was an American audio engineer, best known for his work in film and video games. He was the owner of a recording studio located in the San Francisco Bay Area.

Biography

Prum was born in Fullerton, California, attended Troy High School's technology magnet, and later studied sound for film & video as an undergraduate student at the California Institute of the Arts (CalArts) in the 1990s under John Payne, Craig Smith, and Doug Loveid. While studying at CalArts, Prum worked on many student films, some of which were screened at festivals, such as Spike and Mike's Festival of Animation. One such film, a parody of Schoolhouse Rock! titled Political Correction, was a collaboration between Prum and fellow student Steven Fonti. Another was Adam Lane's Sea Slugs, a stop-motion animation about pirate slugs on the open seas, which was also featured as part of MTV's Cartoon Sushi.

After graduating with a Bachelor of Fine Arts degree, Prum worked as an Electron at Jim Henson's Creature Shop and then briefly at Disney Online. After being let go, he inquired during a CalArts job fair about employment opportunities in the sound department of LucasArts Entertainment Company. He joined the LucasArts sound team in January 1999 and was involved with all of the Star Wars: Episode I – The Phantom Menace release titles and most of the other games published by both LucasArts and Lucas Learning between early 1999 and the beginning of 2001.

Prum departed LucasArts at the start of 2001 and continued to work in video game sound. He contributed sound effects, recorded voiceover and music and mixed cutscenes and orchestral scores for numerous games, such as LucasArts' Knights of the Old Republic, Telltale Games' The Walking Dead: The Game—for which Prum and his team won the Game Audio Network Guild's 2013 award for Best Dialogue—The Wolf Among Us, and Sam & Max episodic titles, Double Fine Productions' crowdfunded Broken Age, Ubisoft's CSI games, and Pandemic Studios' Mercenaries 2: World in Flames. Prum and his dialogue production team have been nominated nine times for "Best Voice Acting" Aggie Awards and have won three times.

In addition to video games, Prum worked in post-production audio for feature films. He created the voice of the big bird, Leo, in Pixar Animation Studio's animated short film For the Birds, earning him a mention in Ralph Eggleston's acceptance speech at the 74th Academy Awards. Prum also worked as the foley recordist on Focus Features' Lost in Translation, and Sony Pictures' Adaptation..

In 2004 Prum set up a recording studio, Studio Jory, near his home in Fairfax, California.

In August 2014, Prum recovered the aging audio archives of the classic point-and-click adventure game Grim Fandango as part of Double Fine Productions' restoration and remastering effort. He also worked with composer Peter McConnell to record and mix the new orchestral score, performed by the Melbourne Symphony Orchestra.

Jory died on April 22, 2016 after suffering severe injuries in a motorcycle accident.

The final game Prum worked on was 2064: Read Only Memories, which is dedicated to him.

Accolades

Game Audio Network Guild Awards

Spillprisen (Norwegian Game Awards)

Independent Games Festival

Golden Joystick Awards

Aggie Awards

National Academy of Video Game Trade Reviewers

Selected games
2064: Read Only Memories (2017), MidBoss
Earthlock: Festival of Magic (2016), Snowcastle Games
Through the Woods (2016), Antagonist
Manual Samuel (2016), Perfectly Paranormal
Grim Fandango Remastered (2015), Double Fine
Among the Sleep (2014), Krillbite Studio
Broken Age (2014), Double Fine
Gabriel Knight: Sins of the Fathers (2014), Pinkerton Road
The Walking Dead: The Game, Season 2 (2014), Telltale Games
The Walking Dead: 400 Days (2013), Telltale Games
The Wolf Among Us (2013), Telltale Games
The Walking Dead: The Game (2012), Telltale Games
Brütal Legend (2009), Double Fine
Tales of Monkey Island (2009), Telltale Games
The Sims 2 (2003), EA/Maxis
Star Wars: Knights of the Old Republic (2003), LucasArts
SimCity 4 (2002), EA/Maxis
Escape from Monkey Island (2000), LucasArts
FlixMix (1993), Celeris

References

External links
 Official site

1975 births
2016 deaths
People from Fairfax, California
Musicians from Fullerton, California
California Institute of the Arts alumni
American audio engineers
American sound designers
Video game developers
Engineers from California